Mark Anthony Towers (born 13 April 1952) is an English former professional footballer who played as a midfielder for Manchester City, Sunderland, Birmingham City, Rochdale and England.

Towers made his professional debut five days after his seventeenth birthday in April 1969, playing for Manchester City in a 3–0 defeat against Southampton. He made a handful of appearances the following season, and scored his first goal, against Leeds United, in one of them. Towards the end of the season, he had a run in the first team, and was part of the team which won the 1970 European Cup Winners Cup scoring the winner in extra time against Portuguese club Athletico De Coimbria en route to the final. He became a first team regular in the 1970–71 season, acting as a utility player. He played as City won the 1972 FA Charity Shield. In 1972, under Malcolm Allison's management, Towers settled into a midfield role, usually wearing the number 11 shirt. He was part of the Manchester City side for the 1974 League Cup Final, but the final proved to be his penultimate game for the Manchester club, as two weeks later he transferred to Sunderland in an exchange deal involving Dennis Tueart and Mick Horswill.

Towers made his Sunderland debut against Fulham in March 1974. His performances at Sunderland resulted in him receiving an England call-up in 1976 for the British Home Championship. He made appearances in the matches against Wales and Northern Ireland, and added a third cap two weeks later in a friendly against Italy.

In the 1977 close season Towers joined Birmingham City for a fee of £140,000. He made his Birmingham debut on 20 August 1977 in a 4–1 defeat to Manchester United. He made 92 League appearances for the club, the last coming in 1979–80. In 1981, Towers moved to the Montreal Manic of the North American Soccer League (NASL). He remained with Montreal through the 1983 season. He then began the 1984 season with the Tampa Bay Rowdies before being traded to the Vancouver Whitecaps, and then finishing his career back in England with Rochdale.

Honours

Club
Manchester City
UEFA Cup Winners' Cup: 1969-70
FA Charity Shield: 1972
League Cup runner-up: 1973-74

Individual
PFA Division Two Team of the Year: 1975-76

References

1952 births
Living people
Footballers from Manchester
English footballers
English expatriate footballers
England international footballers
England under-23 international footballers
Association football midfielders
Manchester City F.C. players
Sunderland A.F.C. players
Birmingham City F.C. players
Rochdale A.F.C. players
Montreal Manic players
Tacoma Stars players
Tampa Bay Rowdies (1975–1993) players
Vancouver Whitecaps (1974–1984) players
English Football League players
North American Soccer League (1968–1984) players
North American Soccer League (1968–1984) indoor players
Major Indoor Soccer League (1978–1992) players
Expatriate soccer players in Canada
Expatriate soccer players in the United States
English expatriate sportspeople in the United States
English expatriate sportspeople in Canada